Rory Orvis (born 22 February 1975) is a former Canadian professional darts player, who played in Professional Darts Corporation events.

Career
Orvis played in the 2004 PDC World Darts Championship, but lost in the last 48 to Colin McGarry of Northern Ireland.

World Championship performances

PDC
 2004: Last 48: (lost to Colin McGarry 0–3) (sets)

References

External links

1975 births
Living people
Canadian darts players
Professional Darts Corporation associate players
Sportspeople from Winnipeg